Ernest Kirk (21 March 1884 – 19 December 1932) was an English cricketer. He played 40 first-class matches for Surrey between 1905 and 1921.

See also
 List of Surrey County Cricket Club players

References

External links
 

1884 births
1932 deaths
English cricketers
Surrey cricketers
People from Clapham
Cricketers from Greater London
W. G. Grace's XI cricketers
Gentlemen cricketers
Gentlemen of the South cricketers